The name Melissa has been used for four tropical cyclones worldwide.

In the Atlantic:
 Tropical Storm Melissa (2007) – short-lived storm west of Cape Verde, never threatened land.
 Tropical Storm Melissa (2013) – short-lived storm in the central Atlantic, never threatened land.
 Tropical Storm Melissa (2019) – short-lived storm that formed in the central Atlantic. 

In the Western Pacific:
 Typhoon Melissa (1994) (T9424, 26W) – remained over open waters

Atlantic hurricane set index articles
Pacific typhoon set index articles